Léopold Hounkanrin is a Beninese sprinter. He competed in the men's 400 metres at the 1980 Summer Olympics.

References

Year of birth missing (living people)
Living people
Athletes (track and field) at the 1980 Summer Olympics
Beninese male sprinters
Olympic athletes of Benin
Place of birth missing (living people)